Statistics of DPR Korea Football League in the 1985 season.

Overview
April 25 Sports Club won the championship.

References
RSSSF

DPR Korea Football League seasons
1
Korea
Korea